Tecmo Stackers, known as  in Japan, is a puzzle video game released first in 1995 by Tecmo to Arcades and ported to both the Sony PlayStation and the SEGA Saturn. Its gameplay is similar to Puyo Puyo.

Gameplay
Players try to connect sets of four blocks so that their colors match, causing the blocks to be removed. Remaining blocks may then fall and complete other sets of four blocks. The main difference between Tecmo Stackers and Puyo Puyo is that blocks in Tecmo Stackers stretch in various directions after adjacent blocks are removed, and the "arms" they send out can complete sets of blocks and be removed; this allows for longer chain reactions.

In arcade mode, players try to keep their stack of blocks from reaching the top of the screen. Long chain reactions send blocks to the opponent's screen. Arcade mode is available for one or two players, with players able to choose their difficulty independently of one another.

Chain reaction mode centers on getting as many chain reactions as possible.

In time trial mode, players try to keep their screen from filling with blocks for as long as possible.

Reception

Tecmo Stackers received mostly mixed reviews. GamePro called it "a highly addictive, Tetris-style puzzle game that's easy enough for anyone to play, yet complex enough to transfix even the best gamers for hours at a time." However, they criticized that the single-player mode is dull and easy, the visual of the blocks stretching out to grab other blocks is "disturbing", and the music is annoying enough to "[make] you want to rip the speakers out of your TV." They gave it a 4.5 out of 5 for both control and fun factor, but a 3.0 for graphics and a 2.0 for sound. Dan Hsu of Electronic Gaming Monthly likewise found the block stretching disturbing, and co-reviewer echoed GamePros strong criticism of the music. Both Hsu and John Ricciardi described it as a second-rate Puyo Puyo clone, and Sushi-X, while likening it instead to Columns but with more technique, agreed that chain reactions are mindlessly easy to accomplish. Contradicting both EGM and GamePro, the reviewer for IGN said that the music is great, and that he found the block stretching animation "strangely arousing". He also highly praised the gameplay in both single-player and multiplayer, but also remarked that the game didn't differentiate itself enough from other Tetris-like games, though it would be enough to satisfy fans of the genre.

References

External links

1995 video games
1997 video games
PlayStation (console) games
PlayStation Network games
Sega Saturn games
Tecmo games
Video games developed in Japan